James Alexander Winter (December 20, 1886 – June 29, 1971) was a lawyer and political figure in Newfoundland and Labrador. He represented Burin East from 1928 to 1932 and Burgeo and La Poile from 1932 to 1934 in the Newfoundland and Labrador House of Assembly as a member of the United Newfoundland Party.

Biography 
The son of James Spearman Winter, he was born in St. John's and was educated at Bishop Feild College and Rossall School in England. Winter was called to the bar in 1910 and practised in St. John's. In 1933, he was named King's Counsel. Winter was speaker for the Newfoundland assembly from 1932 to 1934. He served in the Commission of Government as Commissioner of Home Affairs and Education from 1936 to 1941. In 1941, he was named registrar and chief clerk for the Supreme Court of Newfoundland and Labrador.

In 1915, he married Mary Evangeline Arnaud; the couple had four children. Winter died in St. John's in 1971.

His brother Harry also served as speaker for the assembly.

References 

Speakers of the Newfoundland and Labrador House of Assembly
1886 births
1971 deaths
United Newfoundland Party MHAs
Bishop Feild School alumni
Members of the Newfoundland Commission of Government
Dominion of Newfoundland politicians
Politicians from St. John's, Newfoundland and Labrador